The Ariston Café is a historic restaurant located in Litchfield, Illinois along Old U.S. Route 66. It was added to the U.S. National Register of Historic Places in 2006.

History
The Ariston Café in Litchfield was built in 1935 for original owners Pete Adam and Tom Cokinos, two experienced restaurateurs. Pete Adam had operated an Ariston Café in Carlinville since 1924; after 1930 a highway realignment moved U.S. Route 66 in Illinois further east. Work began on April 4, 1935, by hired contractor Henry A. Vasel and the building was completed on July 5, 1935.

Design
The design of the Ariston Café does not reflect any particular architectural style. Instead, it was built in a utilitarian style, common for small commercial buildings of its time. Despite being non-stylistic, the building does contain echoes of the popular Art Deco style of the time period in its interior booths. On its exterior the Ariston's most distinguishing features are the curved parapet wall on the front façade and its fine and varied brick work. Originally, the Ariston, like many Route 66 businesses, had two fuel pumps fronting it.

Historic significance
The Ariston Café is the longest-operating restaurant along the entire stretch of U.S. Route 66. It is representative of the types of businesses that once met with great success along historic Route 66. Despite a few alterations, including the addition of a banquet room, the building still maintains a historic character from the era of its construction. The Ariston Café was listed on the U.S. National Register of Historic Places on May 5, 2006.

See also
U.S. Route 66 in Illinois

References

External links
 Historical Society of Montgomery County
 Official Website

National Register of Historic Places in Montgomery County, Illinois
Litchfield, Illinois
Buildings and structures on U.S. Route 66
U.S. Route 66 in Illinois
Commercial buildings completed in 1935
Restaurants in Illinois
Restaurants established in 1935
Retail buildings in Illinois
Commercial buildings on the National Register of Historic Places in Illinois
1935 establishments in Illinois
Restaurants on the National Register of Historic Places